Tallykul (Tallıkül) is a rural locality (a village) in Ziriklinsky Selsoviet, Sharansky District, Bashkortostan, Russia. The population was 14 as of 2010. There is 1 street.

Geography 
Tallykul is located 28 km northwest of Sharan (the district's administrative centre) by road. Kurtutel is the nearest rural locality.

References 

Rural localities in Sharansky District